The Xi'an Y-20 Kunpeng is a large military transport aircraft developed by the Xi'an Aircraft Industrial Corporation for the People's Republic of China (PRC).

The aircraft is nicknamed "Chubby Girl" in the Chinese aviation industry because its fuselage is much wider than aircraft previously developed in China.

Development

Images of the Y-20 prototype emerged at the end of 2012. The first flight occurred on 26 January 2013.

In 2014, a report from the People's Liberation Army's National Defence University stated that the PRC's civil and military transport needed 400 Y-20s. In 2016, Zhu Qian of the Aviation Industry Corporation of China stated that more than a thousand were needed.

The airlifter was developed into the Y-20U tanker variant to expand the PLAAF's aerial refueling capability beyond its existing limited and obsolescent Xian H-6U fleet. Evidence of the tanker variant emerged in 2018 with satellite images; its first flight occurred that year. They had begun performing aerial refueling by 2021 and formally entered PLAAF service in 2022.

Design

The Y-20 uses components made of composite materials. The composites are now produced in China, whereas in the past they had to be imported. The Y-20's cabin incorporates flame-retardant composites developed by the 703 Institute of the China Aerospace Science and Technology Corporation (CASC). The 703 Institute was created in March 2009 with development taking three years. The performance of the composites is reportedly comparable to those that fulfill FAR Part 25.835. The 703 Institute achieved another milestone by establishing a comprehensive Chinese evaluation and certification system for aircraft composite materials based on international standards.

The Y-20 is the first cargo aircraft to use 3D printing technology to speed up its development and to lower its manufacturing cost. Model-based definition (MBD) is also used, and it's the third aircraft to utilize MBD technology in the world, after Airbus A380 (2000) and Boeing 787 (2005). A project team to implement MBD for the Y-20 program was formally formed in October 2009, and after the initial success in application on the main landing gear, MBD application was expanded to the entire aircraft and became mandatory for all contractors and sub contractors of the Y-20 program. The implementation of MBD was initially met with strong resistance, with only a third of suppliers agreeing to implement MBD. However, the general designer of Y-20 declared that those who refused to implement MBD will be banned from participating in the Y-20 program, thus forcing everyone to comply, resulting in increases in productivity. The implementation of MBD greatly shortened the time required, for example, without MBD, installation of wings takes a month or two, but with MBD adopted, the time is drastically shortened to just a few hours, and in general, the design work reduced by 40%, preparation for production reduced by 75%, and manufacturing cycle reduced by 30%.

In addition to 3D printing, the Y-20 is also the first aircraft in China adopting associative design technology (ADT) in its development. Headed by the deputy general designer of structural design, Mr. Feng Jun (冯军), the initial attempt to implement ADT actually failed after two months spent on application on the nose section. It was only after the second attempt that took another three months on the application on wings did ADT became successful. The adaptation of ADT greatly shortened the development time by at least eight months, and modification of wing design that previously took a week is shortened to half a day.

Cargo is loaded through a large aft ramp that accommodates rolling stock. The Y-20 incorporates a shoulder wing, T-tail, rear cargo-loading assembly and heavy-duty retractable landing gear, consists of three rows, with a pair of wheels for each row, totaling six wheels for each side. The structural test was completed in 194 days as opposed to the 300 days originally planned, thanks to the successful development and application of an automated structural strength analysis system. In comparison, similar work for the Xian JH-7 took a year. Y-20 incorporates a total of four LCD EFIS, and the development of EFIS for Y-20 utilizes virtual reality via helmet-mounted display. Eight types of different relays used on Y-20 are developed by Guilin Aerospace Co., Ltd. a wholly own subsidiary of China Tri-River Aerospace Group Co., Ltd.(中国三江航天集团), which is also known as the 9th Academy of the China Aerospace Science and Industry Corporation (CASIC).

Propulsion
The Y-20 prototypes were powered by four 12-ton thrust Soloviev D-30KP-2 engines, and the aircraft entered production with those engines.

The Chinese intend to replace the D-30 with the 14-ton thrust Shenyang WS-20, which is required for the Y-20 to achieve its maximum cargo capacity of 66 tons. The WS-20 is derived from the core of the Shenyang WS-10A, an indigenous Chinese turbofan engine for fighter aircraft. Single-engine testing with the WS-20 may have occurred by February 2019. Four-engine testing may have occurred by December 2020. The engine was in development in late-2021.

In 2013, the Shenyang Engine Design and Research Institute was reportedly developing the SF-A, a 28700-pound thrust engine, for the Y-20 and the Comac C919. The SF-A is derived from the core of the WS-15. Compared to the WS-20, the SF-A is a conservative design that does not seek to match the technology of more modern engines.

Testing with the WS-18 may have occurred by late 2017. Compared to the D-30, the WS-18 is 300 kg lighter, weighing in at 2000 kg; with thrust increased from 12.5 per ton of the D-30 to 13.2 per ton; and fuel consumption of the WS-18 is also reduced in comparison to the D-30, and the mean time between overhaul of the WS-18 is 3000 hours. However, because the increase in thrust is not significant in comparison to the D-30, the WS-18 is likely to be a stopgap measure before the WS-20 is ready.

Cargo capacity
The Y-20's four-meter tall hold can lift up to 66 tons, and transport up to 2 Type 15 tanks or 1 Type 99A tank over a distance of 7800 km.

Operational history

On 6 July 2016 the first serial Y-20 (serial number 11051) was handed over to the PLAAF in a ceremony. The second aircraft numbered 11052 followed soon after - it was assigned to the 12th Regiment of the 4th Transport Division at Qionglai, Chengdu.

On 8 May 2018, it was announced by PLAAF's spokesperson Shen Jinke that Y-20 had "recently conducted its first joint airdrop training with the country's airborne troops".

On 13 February 2020, the Y-20 was part of a fleet used to deliver supplies and personnel to Wuhan. The operation was part of an effort to mitigate what became the COVID-19 pandemic. A fleet of 11 aircraft was used to deliver 2,600 military medical staff to Wuhan. The PLAAF fleet of 11 aircraft consists of 6 Y-20s, 3 Il-76s, and 2 Y-9s transport aircraft.

On 28 November 2021, Y-20U aerial tanker was spotted around the southwest side of the Taiwan island among 27 military aircraft. This is the first observeration of Y-20U outside inland China.

On 27 January 2022, two Y-20 aircraft arrived in Tonga after traveling over 10,000 kilometers from Guangzhou Baiyun, delivering 33 tons of supplies including food, fresh water, water purifiers, and tents due to the 2022 Hunga Tonga–Hunga Ha'apai eruption and tsunami.

On 9 April 2022, six Y-20 aircraft landed at Belgrade Nikola Tesla Airport in Serbia, reportedly delivering a shipment of FK-3 surface-to-air missile systems.

On 28 June 2022, six Y-20 arrived in Afghanistan to deliver 105 tonnes of humanitarian aid in response to June 2022 Afghanistan earthquake.

On 1 August 2022, Senior Colonel and PLAAF spokesperson, Shen Jinke, told a press conference that Y-20 tanker aircraft started combat readiness training. The aircraft is confirmed in PLAAF service with the designation YY-20 or YU-20. The designation was later confirmed as YY-20 at Zhuhai Airshow 2022. The YY-20 features redesigned landing gear sponsors with sharper front and back ends, which reduces air turbulence.

In early September 2022, one of the machines was present at the Airpower 22 airshow in Austria. This was the first time that the Y-20 was present at a western airshow.

Variants 
Y-20A
Base variant, with Soloviev D-30KP-2 engines.
Y-20B
Variant with four WS-20 engines.
YY-20
Aerial tanker variant able to carry about 90 tons of fuel, similar to the role of Il-78. The tanker variant features redesigned landing gear sponsors. Previously known as Y-20U or YU-20.
Y-20 AEW
Airborne early warning and control variant under development.

Controversy 
On July 13, 2016, Chinese national Su Bin pleaded guilty, and admitted to charges that he conspired with others to hack into U.S. defense contractor Boeing and steal documents related to the development of the C-17, F-22, and F-35 aircraft. Once the information was stolen, he admitted to analyzing and translating documents from English to Chinese, which he then emailed to the Second Department of the People's Liberation Army General Staff Department. Su Bin admitted he did so for financial gain, and sought to profit from the data that was stolen. In addition to financial gain, court documents revealed, in emails to the Second Department of the PLA, Su Bin noted the information, "...has extremely vital significance in our country's speeding up the development," of Project A, revealed to be China's program to develop the Xi'an Y-20.

Operators
 
 People's Liberation Army Air Force - 34+ in service as of 2021
 One regiment in the 4th Transport Division
 One regiment in the 13th Transport Division

Specifications (Y-20)

See also

References

Citations

Bibliography

Aircraft first flown in 2013
2010s Chinese military transport aircraft
High-wing aircraft
Quadjets
T-tail aircraft
Y-20